Amine Farhane (born 23 March 1998) is a Moroccan professional footballer who plays as a defender for Botola club Wydad AC. He joined from lower-division side Wydad Temara.

Honours 
 Wydad AC

 Botola: 2020–21, 2021-22
 CAF Champions League: 2021–22'

References

External links 
 

Living people
1998 births
Moroccan footballers
Association football defenders
Wydad AC players
Botola players